MHW may be an abbreviation for:

 Marine heatwave
 Mbukushu language (ISO 639 code: mhw), spoken in Namibia
 Mean high water
 Mental health worker, a medical abbreviation
 Monster Hunter: World, a 2018 video game
 Monteagudo Airport (IATA: MHW), Bolivia

See also
 MHW-RTG (Multihundred-watt radioisotope thermoelectric generators)